Messier may refer to:

People with the surname
Charles Messier, French astronomer
Éric Messier, former NHL defenseman
George Messier, French inventor
Jean-Marie Messier, former CEO of Vivendi Universal
Marc Messier, Canadian actor from Quebec
Mark Messier, former NHL player, Hall of fame class 2007 
Paul Arthur Messier, art conservator

Other uses
Messier object, a set of 110 astronomical objects
Messier (crater)
Messier (automobile), a French car produced 1925–1931
Messier-Dowty and preceding companies in manufacture of aircraft undercarriage

French-language surnames